Melvin Michael Hawkrigg  (born August 26, 1930) is a former Canadian football player and accountant who served as the Chancellor of McMaster University from 1998 to 2007. Born in Toronto, he graduated from McMaster in 1952. While at McMaster, he played on the football, basketball, hockey, and track teams and was later inducted into the athletic hall of fame in 1984. Hawkrigg was also inducted into the McMaster University Business Hall of Fame. He also played briefly for the Hamilton Tiger Cats in 1952. In 2014, Hawkrigg and Kathleen Martin Ginis 
were the only McMaster recipients of the Ontario Medal for Good Citizenship for their "exceptional, long-term contributions to the well-being of their communities."

References

1930 births
Living people
Chancellors of McMaster University
McMaster University alumni
People from Toronto